The Bolt Arena (named Telia 5G -areena until January 2020, named Sonera Stadium until April 2017, and Finnair Stadium until August 2010; also known as Töölön jalkapallostadion, "Töölö football stadium") is a football stadium in Helsinki, Finland. It is named after the labour hire company Bolt.Works.

History
The stadium was inaugurated in 2000. It has a capacity of 10,770 spectators. Originally the ground had a natural grass pitch, but it was soon replaced with an artificial one because the grass couldn't get enough sun light. Since then the stadium has seen numerous artificial playing surfaces that have been gradually replaced. The most recent artificial pitch was installed in April 2015.

The ground is located next to the Helsinki Olympic Stadium. Before the current stadium was constructed, it was known as the Helsinki Football Ground and hosted some of the football preliminaries for the 1952 Summer Olympics.

It is the home stadium of HJK, HIFK, and is also used for some friendlies by the Finnish national team. It hosted the 2003 FIFA U-17 World Championship as Töölö Stadium.

The stadium was named as one of the stadiums that host the 2009 UEFA Women's Championship. For that tournament, the artificial turf covering the field was temporarily replaced with grass.

In the 2016 domestic league season, tenants HJK Helsinki drew the highest average home attendance (5,101).

On 15 November 2019, Finland national football team managed to qualify to the first major tournament, UEFA Euro 2020, in their history after defeating Liechtenstein 3–0 at this stadium.

The specifications of the stadium 
 Field size: 105 × 68 metres (UEFA recommendation)
 Floodlights: 1500 lux
 Capacity of 10,770 spectators, all stands are covered
 The main stand is heated
 A warming system under the pitch
 discussion about expanding to 25,000 seats

References

1952 Summer Olympics official report. pp. 62–3.
5gareena.fi Official website. Accessed 8 August 2017.

External links

Helsingin Jalkapalloklubi
Football venues in Finland
Finland national football team
Sports venues in Helsinki
Sports venues completed in 2000
2000 establishments in Finland
Töölö